Ogilby's rainbowfish (Melanotaenia ogilbyi) is a species of rainbowfish in the subfamily Melanotaeniinae. It is endemic to West Papua in Indonesia in the Lorentz River system. This species was described in 1910 by Max C.W. Weber from types collected in the Noord-Fluss ("North River"), now renamed the Lorentz River, by the Dutch explorer Hendrikus Albertus Lorentz in 1907, it was not recorded again until Gerald R. Allen collected more specimens in 1995 and the species was later introduced to the aquarium hobby. Its specific name honours the ichthyologist James Douglas Ogilby (1853-1925).

References

Melanotaenia
Freshwater fish of Western New Guinea
Taxonomy articles created by Polbot
Fish described in 1910